Tanja Andrejeva (born 17 June 1978 in Skopje, Republic of Macedonia) is a Macedonian handball goalkeeper who plays for ŽRK Metalurg and for the Macedonia women's national handball team.

Career
Tanja started her handball career at age of 14 in the youth team of Gjorce Petrov. At age of 19, in the season 1997/98 she became a member of Kometal Gjorče Petrov Skopje team roster. Later she left Kometal Gjorče Petrov Skopje and she played for some Macedonian handball clubs, like RK Tutunski Kombinat from Prilep and for RK Kale Kicevo from Kicevo. In the season 2007/08 she came back in Kometal Gjorče Petrov Skopje and she won the double crown. In 2008, she signed a deal with Serbian handball club ŽRK Kikinda. After one year playing in ŽRK Kikinda she left the club and signed a deal with the Macedonian club ŽRK Metalurg. With ŽRK Metalurg she won the Macedonian Championship and Macedonian Cup three times in a row.

Until now, she has 97 appearances for the Macedonian national team and she has scored 2 goals.

References

1978 births
Living people
Macedonian female handball players
Sportspeople from Skopje